Sinomicrurus macclellandi, commonly known as MacClelland's coral snake, is a species of venomous snake in the family Elapidae. The species is endemic to southern and eastern Asia.

Etymology
The specific name, macclellandi, is in honor of John McClelland, a physician and naturalist, who worked for the East India Company.

Description
Dorsally, it is reddish-brown, with thin, black cross bars, and its belly is creamy white. The head is small, round and black in color, with a broad, creamy white transverse band, and black outlines at the middle of the head. The dorsal scales on the body are smooth, and they are arranged, at midbody, in 13 parallel longitudinal rows.

Geographic range
S. macclellandi is found in northern and northeastern India, Bangladesh, Bhutan, Nepal, northern Myanmar, Thailand, Vietnam, central and southern China (including Hong Kong, Hainan, north to Gansu and Shaanxi), Taiwan, and Ryukyu Islands (Japan). It is also found in Laos.

Subspecies
Three subspecies are recognized, including the nominate subspecies:
Sinomicrurus macclellandi macclellandi 
Sinomicrurus macclellandi nigriventer  – India (Himachal Pradesh, Uttarakhand)
Sinomicrurus macclellandi univirgatus  – Nepal, India (Sikkim

Behavior and habitat
S. macclellandi is mainly nocturnal and terrestrial. It occurs in forest litter, hillside, and lowland. It is often found hiding under leaves. Although this is a venomous species, it is quite docile and not likely to strike actively.

Diet
S. macclellandi preys on small reptiles, such as lizards and snakes.

Venom
Like other elapids, S. macclellandi possesses a potent neurotoxic venom, which is capable of killing a person. Bite symptoms include numbness of lips and difficulty of speech and breathing, followed by blurred vision. Severe bite victims may die of instant heart failure, although there have been only a few human deaths recorded in Thailand.

Reproduction
S. macclellandi is an oviparous species. Mature females lay clutches of 6–14 eggs.

References

Further reading
Boulenger GA (1896). Catalogue of the Snakes in the British Museum (Natural History). Volume III., Containing the Colubridæ (Opisthoglyphæ and Proteroglyphæ), ... London: Trustees of the British Museum (Natural History). (Taylor and Francis, printers). xiv + 727 pp. + Plates I-XXV. ("Callophis [sic] macclellandii [sic]", pp. 398–399).
Reinhardt JT (1844). "Description of a new species of venomous snake, Elaps macclellandi ". Calcutta J. Nat. Hist. 4: 532-534.
Reinhardt JT (1861). "Herpetologiske Middelelser. II. Beskrivelser af nogle nye til Calamariernes Familie henhörende Slänger ". Vidensk. Meddel. Naturhist. Foren. Kjöbenhavn 2 [1860]: 229-250. (in Danish).
Slowinski, Joseph B.; Boundy, Jeff; Lawson, R. (2001). "The phylogenetic relationships of Asian coral snakes (Elapidae: Calliophis and Maticora) based on morphological and molecular characters". Herpetologica 57 (2): 233-245.
Smith MA (1943). The Fauna of British India, Ceylon and Burma, Including the Whole of the Indo-Chinese Sub-region. Reptilia and Amphibia. Vol. III.—Serpentes. London: Secretary of State for India. (Taylor and Francis, printers). xii + 583 pp. ("Callophis [sic] macclellandi ", pp. 423–425, Figure 135).
Eye on Nature Series (2006). "Tracking the snake shadow: terrestrial viper illustrations".  Country Parks Cosmos Books Ltd. (in Chinese, a field guide to the venomous land snakes in Hong Kong) .

External links
 Calliophis macclellandi at Living Hazards Database.

macclellandi
Snakes of Asia
Reptiles of Bangladesh
Reptiles of Bhutan
Snakes of China
Reptiles of India
Reptiles of Japan
Reptiles of Myanmar
Reptiles of Nepal
Reptiles of Taiwan
Reptiles of Thailand
Snakes of Vietnam
Fauna of the Ryukyu Islands
Taxa named by Johannes Theodor Reinhardt
Reptiles described in 1844